Rubidium iodide is a salt with a melting point of 642 °C. Its chemical formula is RbI.

Rubidium iodide can be formed from the reaction of rubidium and iodine:
2  +  → 2

References
 CRC Handbook of Chemistry and Physics, 77th edition

Rubidium compounds
Iodides
Metal halides
Alkali metal iodides
Rock salt crystal structure